Gone Troppo is the tenth studio album by English rock musician George Harrison, released on 5 November 1982 by Dark Horse Records. It includes "Wake Up My Love", issued as a single, and "Dream Away", which was the theme song for the 1981 HandMade Films production Time Bandits. Harrison produced the album with Ray Cooper and former Beatles engineer Phil McDonald.

With Harrison uninterested in the contemporary music scene and unwilling to promote the release, Gone Troppo failed to chart in the United Kingdom, and it was his only post-Beatles studio album not to chart inside the top 20 in the United States. For the next five years, he largely took an extended hiatus from his music career, with only the occasional soundtrack recording surfacing.

Background
By the early 1980s, Harrison had been finding the current musical climate alienating. His 1981 album Somewhere in England had sold fairly well, aided by the John Lennon tribute hit, "All Those Years Ago", but in the United States it was Harrison's first album since the Beatles' break-up that failed to receive gold certification from the RIAA. With one album left on his current recording contract, Harrison recorded Gone Troppo in 1982 but refused to promote it or make music videos for the two singles. The title is an Australian slang expression meaning "gone mad or crazy due to tropical heat" or just "gone mad".

Artwork
The album's artwork was credited to "Legs" Larry Smith, formerly of the Bonzo Dog Doo-Dah Band.

Release
Gone Troppo was issued on Dark Horse Records in November 1982. Warner Bros. Records, which distributed Harrison's Dark Horse label, were at a loss as to how to market the album and matched the artist's indifference by failing to promote the release. The album peaked at number 108 in the United States and failed to chart at all in the United Kingdom.

"Wake Up My Love" and "That's the Way It Goes" were included on Harrison's Best of Dark Horse 1976–1989 album, and the title track also appeared on the compact disc version of that 1989 compilation. No tracks from Gone Troppo were included on the 2009 career-spanning collection Let It Roll. "That's the Way It Goes" was covered by Joe Brown and other musicians at the Concert for George in November 2002.

In 2004, Gone Troppo was remastered and reissued, both separately from and as part of the deluxe box set The Dark Horse Years 1976–1992. The reissue added a demo version of "Mystical One" as its sole bonus track.

Critical reception

Among contemporary reviews, Billboard said of Gone Troppo: "Harrison's sunny lyricism shines brightest when least encumbered by self-consciousness, and here that equation yields a breezy, deceptively eclectic charmer."
People magazine's reviewer wrote: "Because of his forays into the mystical, Harrison's penchant for whimsy often gets overlooked. But here the zany side gets no short shrift." The reviewer admired "lovelies" such as "Wake Up My Love" and "Dream Away", and described Gone Troppo as a "vinyl postcard" offering "flashes of brilliance".

Less impressed, Steve Pond of Rolling Stone said that, of late, Harrison had "made a much better movie financier than musician", and he found the album "So offhand and breezy as to be utterly insubstantial", with "Wake Up My Love" the only song of note. Writing for Musician, Roy Trakin considered that, in the wake of Lennon's assassination two years before, Harrison's "tortured honesty … dooms this record's attempt to heal those psychic wounds with calm, offhanded music". Trakin admired some of the guitar playing on the album but concluded: "It's too bad the public won't forget George Harrison was a Beatle. His musical output will undoubtedly suffer by comparison until we do."

Reviewing more recently for AllMusic, critic William Ruhlmann writes of Gone Troppo: "Clearly, Harrison could no longer treat his musical career as a part-time stepchild to his interests in car racing and movie producing if he wanted to maintain it. As it turned out, he didn't; this was his last album for five years." Writing in the 2004 edition of The Rolling Stone Album Guide, Mac Randall opined: "The dynamic, synth-driven 'Wake Up My Love' opens Gone Troppo and the spooky 'Circles' (yet another lost Beatles song) closes it, but there ain't much in between."

John Harris of Mojo likens Gone Troppo to Harrison's final album for EMI/Capitol, Extra Texture (1975), and dismisses it as "Another contract-finisher, this time with Warner Brothers, recorded super-quick, and issued with barely any promotion." Music Box editor John Metzger also holds it in low regard, writing: "Gone Troppo was undoubtedly the worst of George Harrison's solo albums … A few tunes, such as That's the Way It Goes and Unknown Delight, might have worked better if given different arrangements, but as a whole, Gone Troppo was a largely forgettable and sometimes embarrassing affair that appealed only to complete-ists and fanatics."

More impressed, Dave Thompson wrote in Goldmine magazine of its standing as the release that preceded Harrison's temporary retirement from music: "to accuse the album itself of hastening that demise is grossly unfair." While conceding that it was a far from essential Harrison album, Thompson considered it to be "no worse than much of [Paul] McCartney's period output" and opined that "Dream Away" and "Circles" "stand alongside any number of Harrison's minor classics".

Kit Aiken of Uncut describes Gone Troppo as "a return to form of sorts" after Somewhere in England and a collection of "amiable, light-hearted music made by a bunch of mates with nothing to prove". In another favourable 2004 assessment, for Rolling Stone, Parke Puterbaugh wrote: "Gone Troppo might just be Harrison's most underrated album … [It] captures Harrison at his most relaxed and playful on songs such as the title track."

Track listing
All songs written and composed by George Harrison, except where noted.

Side one
"Wake Up My Love" – 3:34
"That's the Way It Goes" – 3:34
"I Really Love You" (Leroy Swearingen) – 2:54
"Greece" – 3:58
"Gone Troppo" – 4:25

Side two
"Mystical One" – 3:42
"Unknown Delight" – 4:16
"Baby Don't Run Away" – 4:01
"Dream Away" – 4:29
"Circles" – 3:46

Bonus track
Gone Troppo was remastered and reissued in 2004 with the bonus track:
"Mystical One" (demo version) – 6:02

Personnel
 George Harrison – vocals, electric and acoustic guitars, synthesiser, bass, mandolin, marimba, jal tarang, backing vocals, production
 Ray Cooper – percussion, marimba, glockenspiel, electric piano, sound effects, production
 Mike Moran – keyboards, synthesiser, piano, synthesiser bass
 Henry Spinetti – drums (1–6, 10)
 Herbie Flowers – bass
 Billy Preston – organ, piano, keyboards, synthesizer, backing vocals
 Jim Keltner – percussion, drums
 Joe Brown – mandolin, backing vocals (6)
 Dave Mattacks – drums (9)
 Alan Jones – bass (9)
 Neil Larsen – piano (7)
 Gary Brooker – synthesizer (7)
 Willie Weeks – bass (7)
 Jon Lord – synthesizer (10)
 Willie Greene – backing vocals, bass voice
 Bobby King – backing vocals
 Vicki Brown – backing vocals
 Pico Pena – backing vocals
 Syreeta – backing vocals
 Sarah Ricor – backing vocals
 Rodina Sloan – backing vocals
 Phil McDonald – production
 Legs Larry Smith – art direction, design

Chart positions

References

External links
 

1982 albums
George Harrison albums
Albums produced by George Harrison
Dark Horse Records albums
Albums recorded at FPSHOT